The following are the national records in athletics in Anguilla maintained by its national athletics federation: Anguilla Amateur Athletic Federation (AAAF).

Outdoor

Key to tables:

h = hand timing

Mx = mixed race

Men

Women

Indoor

Men

Women

References
General
World Athletics Statistic Handbook 2019: National Outdoor Records
World Athletics Statistic Handbook 2018: National Indoor Records
Specific

External links
AAAA web site

Anguilla
Records
Athletics
Athletics